Suduwol is a village in Upper River Division, Gambia. It is a Soninke-speaking village with a population of approximately 3780. The village is made of seven tributes (Tunkara, Jaguraga, Sillah, Nimaga, Trawally, Sinera and Kanteh, and minority tribes including sawaneh and samura kunda, Kaira kunda, Danjo, Dambelly). It is currently ruled by the Tunkara tribe which holds positions such as Head of the city (Degumee) and Imam. ( Jaguraga kunda holds all other leadership positions. This was the agreement of the founders of the village according to oral historians )

The current head of the city is Alhagie Maju Tunkara (Nov-2018).  The Tunkaras in Gambia are all Soninke people. They live throughout West Africa and many immigrated to Europe. 

Suduwol is home to A primary and a secondary school. Recently a high school has been established.The village also have Islamic school known as Madrasa.

Very important figures of suduwol include Ex-Chief of Kantora! ALH YUKASSE TUNKARA, Billay G Tunkara current MP of Kantora, Alhagie Kibily Jaguraga, Mpa Masa, Alhagie Billay Tunkara, Alh. Ebrima (current Imam) his son Dembo Touray Tunkara who currently lead people in prayers because the father old age.  etc.

The Soninke, also called Saraculeh or Serahuli, are a Mande people who descend from the Bafour and closely related to the Imraguen of Mauritania. They speak Soninke, a mande language. They were the founders of the ancient empire of Ghana, 750-1240 CE. Subgroups of Soninke include the Maraka and Wangara. After contact with Muslim Almoravid traders from the north around 1066, Soninke nobles of neighboring Takrur were among the first ethnic groups from Africa to embrace Islam. When the Ghana empire dispersed, the resulting diaspora brought Soninkes to Mali, Senegal, Mauritania, Gambia and Guinea-Bissau. This diaspora included Wangara, famous traders who spread far from traditionally Mande areas. Hence the term Wangara is used today in Ghana and Burkina Faso to describe the Soninke populations in cities and towns.

The original text was written by;
Bakumba Tunkara of Suduwol in 2010.

Diet

The Suduwol consumer a variety of foods. Breakfast foods include “Honde”, porridge made of millet, sugar, milk and salt and “Sombi” porridge made of rice, millet or corn. For lunch “Demmu Teray” and “Takhahay” are very common, both containing rice and peanuts, common Soninke ingredients. "Deray”, a stew, is a mixture of millet and beans.

Economy
The primary occupations are trade and agriculture. During the rainy season, men and women both cultivate. However women usually stay at home to cook and take care of children. They also work dyeing cotton material. A typical Soninke colour is Indigo. The Suduwol attained a high standard of living.

Young men go to neighbouring cities to work. Since the 1960s, the majority of West African immigrants in France came from the Soninke.

References
www.suduwol.wordpress.com

@suduwol

Populated places in the Gambia
Upper River Division

This story was researched by Bakumba Tunkara and edited and posted on this site by Billy Tunkara. Bakumba Tunkara interviewed many elders in the village to put together this powerful history of Suduwol Village kantora. He also researched Soninke tribe arrival in the Gambia and many more. He now host a news channel on Yooutube (Tunkara2020)